Đông Pháp Thời Báo (Indochina Times; 2 May 1923 to 22 December 1928) was a Vietnamese language newspaper in Saigon. The founder and editor was Diệp Văn Kỳ.

References

Vietnamese-language newspapers
Mass media in Ho Chi Minh City
Defunct newspapers published in Vietnam

Publications established in 1923

Publications disestablished in 1928
1923 establishments in Vietnam
1928 disestablishments in Vietnam